Corriverton is the easternmost town in Guyana.

Corriverton is located about 195 mi/313 km from Georgetown on the eastern side of Guyana, in the county of Berbice. Its population in 2012 was 11,386.

It is a modern administrative construction, formed from two older towns, Springlands and Skeldon, and several villages which were named, or rather numbered (e.g. '78'), after their sugar plantations, owned by Bookers.

Corriverton has a mixed population of Hindus, Christians and Muslims living together. It is the site of many mosques, temples and churches, and has an excellent educational system.

Hotels in the town include the Paraton Inn, Mahogany Hotel, Riverton Suites, Hotel Malinmar, the Swiss Guest House and many others. Corriverton is very economical for tourists.

Ferry
Since 1998, the CANAWAIMA ferry connects Moleson Creek, 10 km south of Corriverton, with South Drain in Suriname. This is the only legal connection between the two countries, but before the repavement of the road many travelers preferred to take a back-track route.

References

External links 
 GuyanaGuide.com

Populated places in East Berbice-Corentyne
Guyana–Suriname border crossings